Gaithersburg High School (GHS) is located in Gaithersburg, Maryland. Part of Montgomery County Public Schools, the school was founded in 1904 as "Gaithersburg School" and offered grades K-12. Since 2013, the school resides at 101 Education Blvd and currently offers education for those in grades 9–12. Both Forest Oak Middle School and Gaithersburg Middle School feed into the high school.

History

Gaithersburg High School was established in 1904 on North Summit Ave, the site of present-day Gaithersburg Elementary School. In 1951, a new school building was built at the south end of South Summit Avenue on the opposite side of town. The building was expanded over the years, with a complete renovation of the A, B, C, and N wings in 1978. In 2007, a new wing was added to that building. From 2011 to 2013, a new school building was built on the grounds of the former, which was demolished with the exception of the parts of the building that were built in 2007, as well as Newman Auditorium, which was built in 1972. The new school building was integrated into the surviving portions of the old school building. The school's address from 1951 to 2013 was 314 South Frederick Avenue. On July 1, 2018, Cary D. Dimmick was appointed as the new principal of Gaithersburg High School, replacing Christine Handy-Collins.

2011–2013 renovations
In the summer of 2011, construction began on a new school building. The project added to the wing built in 2007 and included renovations to that wing. A limited amount of student parking was available at the time because the new building was constructed on the old student lot. The project was completed in time for the beginning of the 2013–14 school year.

Student demographics 
As of 2019, Gaithersburg High School reported that 55% of students were of Hispanic origins, 21.9% were African American, 12.8% were White, and 6.9% were Asian American and less than 5% were mixed race. In addition 53.% of students were male compared to 47% identifying as female.

Sports

State champions
1961 Boys Cross Country
1965 Boys Track and Field
1966 Boys Track and Field
1971 Boys Cross Country
1986 Boys Track and Field
1986 Football
1992 Football
1998 Boys Basketball
1998 Boys Track and Field
2000 Boys Track and Field
2000 Football
2000 Boys Cross Country
2002 Boys Track and Field
2005 Girls Volleyball
2009 Boys Indoor Track & Field
2011 Girls Basketball State Champions
2012 Girls Basketball State Champions
2015 Boys Varsity Baseball State Champions

Notable alumni

 Tosin Abasi, guitarist 
 William Brown, NFL player
 Jeanine Cummins, best-selling author.
 Floyd Cunningham, president of Asia-Pacific Nazarene Theological Seminary
 Dominique Dawes, Olympic gymnast 
 Hank Fraley, NFL center 
 Judah Friedlander, comedian and actor 
 Tony Greene, NFL defensive back
 Logic, rapper 
 Tom McHale, NFL offensive guard
 Malcolm Miller, NBA player
 Nick Mullen, host of the Cum Town Podcast
 David O'Connor, Olympic equestrian 
 Guy Prather, NFL linebacker 
 Mark Schenker, songwriter, producer, musician
 Alice Shaw, physician
 Eddie Stubbs, Grand Ole Opry announcer, DJ, fiddler, bluegrass historian
 J. Maarten Troost, author 
 Jodie Turner-Smith, actor

References

External links

Educational institutions established in 1904
Public high schools in Montgomery County, Maryland
1904 establishments in Maryland
Buildings and structures in Gaithersburg, Maryland